Ashok Kumar Rai is a Nepalese politician belonging to the People's Socialist Party. He was previously the vice-chairman of CPN (Unified Marxist-Leninist) before he broke off with other indigenous leaders in the party to form the Federal Socialist Party. He later merged the party with Madheshi Janaadhikar Forum and Khas Samabesi Party to form the Federal Socialist Forum.

He was elected to the House of Representatives from Sunsari 1 at the 2022 general elections. He had previously served as an MP from Khotang 2 and Khotang 3 after being elected at the 1991 and 1994 elections respectively. He was also elected as a member of the 2nd Nepalese Constituent Assembly from the Federal Socialist Party list.

References

Communist Party of Nepal (Unified Marxist–Leninist) politicians
Living people
Nepal MPs 1991–1994
Nepal MPs 1994–1999
Rai people
Members of the 2nd Nepalese Constituent Assembly
People's Socialist Party, Nepal politicians
Nepal MPs 2022–present
1957 births